"Kant Nobody" is a song by American rapper Lil Wayne featuring sampled vocals from American rapper DMX, released on February 23, 2023. It is speculated to be the lead single from Wayne's upcoming studio album The Carter VI. The song was produced by Swizz Beatz and Avenue Beatz.

Background
In an interview with Zane Lowe on Apple Music 1, Lil Wayne hinted he made the song in reaction to his inclusion on Billboard's list of the "Top 50 Greatest Rappers of All Time" (at number 7).

Composition
"Kant Nobody" begins with a sample of DMX speaking in an interview, before a sample of "Niggaz Done Started Something" from DMX's album It's Dark and Hell Is Hot is played throughout the track. In the chorus, Lil Wayne raps about his lyrical skill and legacy while referencing the process of composing the song: "Best rapper, ex-trapper, dress dapper / Swizzy gave me a head-banger, a neck-snapper / X-factor, make a rapper an example / All I need is a beat with a DMX sample".

Critical reception
Aron A. of HotNewHipHop gave the song a "Very Hottttt" rating and wrote, "...Lil Wayne delivers one of his best performances in a minute. While Wayne delivers one of his best verses in a minute, the song, unfortunately, limits DMX's contributions to a sample instead of a full 16 bars. Still, Lil Wayne and Swizz continue to shine as collaborators following the release of 'Uproar.'"

Charts

References

2023 singles
2023 songs
Lil Wayne songs
DMX (rapper) songs
Song recordings produced by Swizz Beatz
Songs written by Lil Wayne
Songs written by DMX (rapper)
Songs written by Swizz Beatz
Songs written by Marvin Gaye
Young Money Entertainment singles
Republic Records singles